Kim Han-sol (born 16 June 1995) is the eldest son of Kim Jong-nam and a grandson of the former North Korean ruler Kim Jong-il. His father was the unofficial heir apparent until 2001, when he fell out of favor with the regime after a failed attempt to secretly visit Tokyo Disneyland in May 2001.

Kim Han-sol's half-uncle, Kim Jong-un, was named the heir apparent in September 2010, and succeeded Kim Jong-il upon the latter's death in December 2011. Since his father's assassination in 2017, his whereabouts have been unknown.

Early life and education
Kim Han-sol was born in Pyongyang in 1995 and had an isolated upbringing in Mainland China and Macau. Kim Han-sol first came to public attention in 2011 when he was accepted by Li Po Chun United World College, a member of the UWC movement, to study in Hong Kong. Later, he was denied a student visa by the Hong Kong government. In late 2011, due to an admissions announcement by the United World Colleges' (UWC) United World College in Mostar, Bosnia and Herzegovina campus, it was discovered by the South Korean media that one of the newly admitted students to the college was Kim Han-sol, about whom very little had been previously known.

The South Korean media tracked down several online accounts maintained by Kim Han-sol. The content of the accounts were widely spread online, providing stark contrast to his grandfather's regime. In various posted messages on YouTube, Facebook, and Twitter, he expressed guilt for his family's role in the suffering of the North Korean people. He expressed guilt about having enough to eat when his people in North Korea were starving, and he appeared to criticize his uncle – the heir apparent – Kim Jong-un.

In October 2012, Kim Han-sol made his first ever televised interview (in English) with Finnish TV network Yle, making several comments about his desire for Korean reunification, and not disputing the interviewer Elisabeth Rehn's disparaging characterizations of Kim Han-sol's grandfather's and uncle's rule over North Korea.

In December 2013, Kim was in his first year of study at the Le Havre campus of France's Sciences Po university. Following the execution of his grand uncle Jang Song-thaek in December 2013, he was placed under police protection. He completed his studies at Sciences Po in 2016.

Assassination of Kim Jong-nam 

Kim Han-sol's father Kim Jong-nam died in Malaysia on 13 February 2017, after two women attacked him at the Kuala Lumpur International Airport, and rubbed his face with VX nerve agent, a lethal chemical weapon. On 7 March 2017 a video surfaced of Kim Han-sol that was by a group called Free Joseon, and though parts of it were censored, he stated that he was with his mother and sister and hoping that it would "get better soon." The uncensored video was later uploaded in 2019, with Han-Sol thanking Adrian Hong and his team for his help.

His father's body was flown back to North Korea on 31 March, despite his protests.

In October 2017, Chinese police arrested two North Korean agents in Beijing, on suspicion of plotting to harm Kim Han-sol, according to the South Korean newspaper JoongAng Ilbo. The two suspects were members of North Korea's Reconnaissance General Bureau, which is responsible for overseas espionage and part of a team of seven that was foiled by Chinese authorities. In April 2020, however, Bloomberg News journalists Kanga Kong and Jon Herskovitz reported that Kim Han-sol's "whereabouts remain unknown" since the assassination. In November 2020, it was reported that Han-sol had been taken into protective custody by the Central Intelligence Agency at some point following his father's assassination. In January 2023, Chun In-bum, a former Lieutenant general in the South Korean Army, told The Daily Telegraph that Han-sol "seems to be somewhere in Europe being protected and taken care of".

Family tree

See also

 Kim family (North Korea)
 List of Koreans
 Politics of North Korea

References

External links
 Cheollima Civil Defense
  
 "Rare interview with Kim Jong-il's son", BBC, 7 June 2009 (video)
 "NK leader’s grandson wants normal life", The Korea Times, 27 October 2011, interview
 "Kim Jong-il’s Grandson is Living With a Libyan Revolutionary" North Korea News, 18 October 2012
 "Kim Jong-il's 'Hipster' Grandson Reported Missing By Bosnian Media" IB Times, 25 April 2013
 "Kim Jong-Un's nephew Kim Han-Sol graduates from boarding school in Bosnia"  News.com.au, 5 June 2013

1995 births
Living people
People from Pyongyang
Kim dynasty (North Korea)
North Korean expatriates in Macau
People educated at a United World College